Galina Nikolayevna Prozumenshchikova (26 November 1948 – 19 July 2015) was a Soviet breaststroke swimmer who also competed in medley relays. She won five Olympic medals in 1964, 1968 and 1972 and five European Championships medals in 1966 and 1970. Her first Olympic medal, the gold in 200 m breaststroke in 1964, was the first Olympic gold in swimming for the Soviet Union. From 1964 to 1966, she set five world records: four in 200 m and one in 100 m breaststroke events. Between 1963 and 1972, she won 15 national titles and set 27 national records.

Biography
Galina was born in Sevastopol, in the Russian SFSR of the Soviet Union. She married twice and therefore changed her last name first to Stepanova and then to Ivannikova.

Her father, Nikolai Nikolayevich (1913–1991) was a submarine captain. Her mother, Sofia Petrovna (1922–1987) was a nurse and took part in World War II. Galina started swimming in a club in 1959 and until 1966 competed for SKF Sevastopol. By the time of her first Olympics in 1964, she had won several national and international competitions and set national and world records in the 200 m breaststroke. (Her favorite discipline was 100 m breaststroke, but it became an Olympic event only in 1968.) However, she underwent surgery for appendicitis in July, just before the Games, and was not in her top form. She also had a strong rival, Svetlana Babanina, who set a world record in the 100 m breaststroke before the 1964 Olympics. Nevertheless, Prozumenshchikova won the 200 m event, setting a new Olympic record and winning the first Soviet Olympic gold in swimming. Babanina finished third.

In 1966, Prozumenshchikova enrolled in the faculty of journalism of the Moscow State University (MSU) and moved to Moscow. That year, she set her final and fastest record for the 200 m breaststroke at 2:40.8—nearly seven full seconds lower than her first record of 2:47.7 in 1964—winning a gold medal in the event at the 1966 European Aquatics Championships, as well as taking silver in medley. Two years later, at the 1968 Summer Olympics, she came within one-tenth of a second of taking gold in the 100 m breaststroke. She settled for silver in the 100 m event and bronze in the 200 m breaststroke.

In 1969, Prozumenshchikova gave birth to a daughter, Irina, and was on the verge of retiring. However, she returned to competition in 1970, winning gold in the 100 m and 200 m breaststroke and another medley silver at the European Aquatics Championships that year. She swam for the Soviet Union in the 1972 Summer Olympics, repeating her 1968 performances in both the 100 m and 200 m to add two more Olympic medals to her tally, and retired the following year.

Prozumenshchikova graduated from MSU in 1976 and was writing sports columns for the major newspaper Izvestia. However, she soon left journalism, and between 1976 and 1980 worked as a sports functionary, and after 1980 as a swimming coach for children at CSKA.  Along the way, in the 1970s, she remarried to economist Yuri Ivanovich Ivannikov (born 1950) and had a son, Grigory Yurievich, in 1979. In 1991, she competed in swimming again and set at least 35 national records in the "masters" category.

Prozumenshchikova died aged 66 in Moscow on 19 July 2015 after a long illness, according to the Russian Swimming Federation. Her body was cremated.

Awards and honors

In 2013, two years before her death, Prozumenshchikova was recognized as one of the "100 Greatest Swimmers in History" in a book by swim journalist John Lohn. She ranked at number 60 in the book, which highlighted her Olympic and European medals and prowess in setting new world records.

Prozumenshchikova also received special distinctions from her mother country, including:
Order of the Red Banner of Labour (1972)
Order of Friendship of Peoples (1993)
Medal "For Distinguished Labour" (twice)

See also
 List of members of the International Swimming Hall of Fame
 World record progression 100 metres breaststroke
 World record progression 200 metres breaststroke

References

External links

1948 births
2015 deaths
Soviet female swimmers
Russian female swimmers
Female breaststroke swimmers
Olympic swimmers of the Soviet Union
Swimmers at the 1964 Summer Olympics
Swimmers at the 1968 Summer Olympics
Swimmers at the 1972 Summer Olympics
Olympic gold medalists for the Soviet Union
World record setters in swimming
Olympic bronze medalists in swimming
European Aquatics Championships medalists in swimming
Sportspeople from Sevastopol
Moscow State University alumni
Honoured Masters of Sport of the USSR
Recipients of the Order of Friendship of Peoples
Russian journalists
Soviet journalists
Medalists at the 1972 Summer Olympics
Medalists at the 1968 Summer Olympics
Medalists at the 1964 Summer Olympics
Olympic silver medalists for the Soviet Union
Olympic bronze medalists for the Soviet Union
Olympic gold medalists in swimming
Olympic silver medalists in swimming
Universiade medalists in swimming
Universiade gold medalists for the Soviet Union
Universiade bronze medalists for the Soviet Union
Medalists at the 1970 Summer Universiade
Medalists at the 1973 Summer Universiade